Wouter George (born 3 March 2002) is a Belgian professional footballer who plays as a midfielder for Belgian club OH Leuven U23 in the third-tier Belgian National Division 1.

Career
On 17 November 2020, George signed a professional contract with Gent until 2023. George made his professional debut with Gent in a 2-0 UEFA Europa League loss to Red Star Belgrade on 26 November 2020.

References

External links

RTBF Profile
ACFF Profile

2002 births
Footballers from Flemish Brabant
Living people
Belgian footballers
Belgium youth international footballers
Association football midfielders
K.A.A. Gent players
Sportspeople from Leuven